Carmelo Urbano Fontiveros (born 3 February 1997 in Coín) is a Spanish cyclist, who currently rides for the UCI ProTeam .

Major results
2018
 2nd Road race, National Under–23 Road Championships.
2019
 1st  Road race, National Under–23 Road Championships.

References

External links

1997 births
Living people
Spanish male cyclists
Sportspeople from the Province of Málaga
Cyclists from Andalusia